Erkan Yılmaz (born December 3, 1997) is a Turkish professional basketball player who plays as a Small forward for Türk Telekom of the Turkish Basketbol Süper Ligi (BSL).

References

External links
Erkan Yılmaz Euroleague.net Profile
Erkan Yılmaz TBLStat.net Profile
Erkan Yılmaz Eurobasket Profile
Erkan Yılmaz TBL Profile

Living people
1997 births
Bahçeşehir Koleji S.K. players
Bandırma Kırmızı B.K. players
Bandırma B.İ.K. players
Small forwards
Turkish men's basketball players
Yeşilgiresun Belediye players